X-Men: Children of the Atom is a six-issue comic book limited series released in 1999, retelling the origins of the X-Men.

The first issue is about the teenagerhood of Cyclops, Jean Grey, Iceman, Beast and Angel, while the mutants have just appeared in the news.
Professor X is pretending to be a school coordinator, in order to help the young mutants.

References
X-Men: Children of the Atom @ comicbookdb.com

1999 comics debuts
Marvel Comics limited series